My Friend Max is a 1994 Canadian drama film, written by Guy Fournier and Jefferson Lewis, and directed by Michel Brault. The film premiered in February 1994 at the Rendez-vous du cinéma québécois.

Plot
The film is set in contemporary Quebec City, Quebec.

Catherine (Marthe Keller), a concert pianist, is surprised one night by the arrival of her childhood friend Max (Geneviève Bujold), whom she hasn't seen for 25 years. Catherine and Max were students together at the Music Conservatory in Quebec City, and were the most promising pianists. While still in her teens, the adventurous Max gets pregnant. She wants to keep the child, but her domineering mother forces her to give him up for adoption. The rebellious Max then leaves Quebec and the music world. Now, years later, she returns, obsessed with finding her son. With the help of Catherine, she locates the adoption records and social workers contact her son to ask if he wants to see her. He refuses, but she keeps trying until they are reunited.

Cast
 Geneviève Bujold as Marie-Alexandrine Brabant
 Marthe Keller as Catherine Mercier
 Johanne McKay as Marie-Alexandrine (adolescente)
 Marie Guillard as Catherine (adolescente)
 Michel Rivard as Denis Lajeunesse
 Rita Lafontaine as Madame Brabant
 Véronique Le Flaguais as Mme Michaud
 Jean-Louis Roux as Père Berube
 Patrice Bissonnette as Michael Simard

Awards
At RVCQ, Bujold won the award for Best Performance, McKay won the award for Most Promising Actor, and Guy Fournier and Jefferson Lewis won the award for Best Screenplay.

The film was selected as the Canadian entry for the Best Foreign Language Film at the 67th Academy Awards, but was not accepted as a nominee.

It received six Genie Award nominations at the 15th Genie Awards in 1994, for Best Picture, Best Actress (Bujold), Best Supporting Actor (Rivard), Best Supporting Actress (McKay), Best Cinematography (Sylvain Brault) and Best Editing (Jacques Gagné).

See also
 List of submissions to the 67th Academy Awards for Best Foreign Language Film
 List of Canadian submissions for the Academy Award for Best Foreign Language Film

References

External links
 

1994 films
1994 drama films
Canadian drama films
Films directed by Michel Brault
Films set in Quebec City
1990s French-language films
French-language Canadian films
1990s Canadian films